Jerrold J. Mundis (March 3, 1941 – April 4, 2020) was an American author, speaker and counselor. He  wrote on the creation of healthy money relationships for individuals, including debt reduction and income growth. Mundis was also a teacher of professional and avocational writing and the author of a book about writer's block.

Early life
Mundis was born March 3, 1941, in Chicago, Illinois. He attended Beloit College from 1959 through 1961 and in 1963, received a B.A. from New York University. He became an editor at The New York Times and was a member of the Authors Guild, PEN American Center, and Poets & Writers. He was listed in Contemporary Authors and the Directory of American Poets & Fiction Writers. Some of his books were selected for The Book-of-the-Month Club, the Literary Guild, and the One Spirit Book Club.

Novels and Non-Fiction
Mundis wrote both fiction and non-fiction, including ghostwritten books, and some 100 short stories, essays and articles in publications such as the New York Times Magazine, Harper's Weekly and American Heritage.  In 1968, Mundis and a partner wrote "King of the Ice Cream Mountain," a one act play for children. He wrote under his own name as well as a number of pseudonyms. Under his Robert Calder persona, Mundis won a Dog Writers Association of America award in 1977 for "The Dogs," a widely read novel. The Chicago Tribune once said of him, "One day Calder is Julia Withers, Gothic novelist. The next, he's Eric Corder, black historian. Or Franklin W. Dixon, one of the writers who pen Hardy Boy serials. He's also Jack Lancer, creator of Chris Cool, Teen Agent."

Mundis wrote 17 novels, including his celebrated "Gerhardt's Children." The New York Times said about the book, "It is a tricky narrative to bring off, involving as it does many centrifugal lives, but Mr. Mundis brings it off."

Under the pseudonym Eric Corder, Mundis wrote his "Shame and Glory" saga about the American slave trade. The saga included the books, "Slave Ship," "Slave," "The Long Tattoo," "Hell Bottom," and "Running Dogs." As Corder, he also wrote a non-fiction book, "Prelude to Civil War: Kansas-Missouri, 1854-61"  recounting the Bleeding Kansas affair from both the Pro-slavery and Free Soil points of view, beginning with the famous Kansas-Nebraska Act of 1854. 

As Julia Withers, Mundis wrote "Echo in a Dark Wind," a neo-gothic novel that was published in 1966.

Several titles by Mundis were about canines including ghost-written training books about "a celebrated collie" (Lassie). He also wrote "The Dogs," "The Guard Dog: Maximum Protection for You, Your Home, and Your Business," and "The Dog Book," an appreciation of the animals that he edited featuring writing by Doris Lessing, E.B. White, Edward Hoagland, William Cowper, John Burroughs, and John Steinbeck. Mundis was interviewed about his novel "The Dogs" under the pseudonym Robert Calder on Terry Gross on Fresh Air May 26, 1976.

Mundis is most known for his 13 books of nonfiction, particularly, "How To Get Out Of Debt, Stay Out Of Debt & Live Prosperously," "Earn what You Deserve: How to Stop Underearning & Start Thriving," and "Making Peace With Money."

Debt management expertise 

Mundis spoke regularly on debt and personal money privately and for many professional societies and associations. 
His clientele ranged from the US Customs and Border Protection to the National Education Association, Unity Church, as well as private individuals across the United States. A recovered "debtor" himself, he was intimately familiar with the success of the Debtors Anonymous program.

With his focus on "gaining happier relationships with money" as a writer and public speaker, he was internationally recognized in the 12 step world for helping others and introducing them to the recovery movement. Mundis framed the societal problem this way: “Discussion of personal finances, particularly indebtedness, may be the last American taboo.” He pinpointed the issue for the individual suffering from compulsive debt saying, “Admitting the problem is essential...being willing to face facts...” with the caveat “denial is nearly universal.”

In his book "Earn What You Deserve," a book on "under-earning," Mundis' advice for treating the "compulsive" behavior begins with "three cardinal rules: do not incur debt, do not take work that pays less than you require and do not say 'no' to money."

Personal life and death
Jerry Mundis' mother was Dolores Mundis of Bethesda, Maryland. Jerry Mundis’ father was Kansas native and WWII Navy veteran James M. Mundis, a journalist and public relations director who worked two decades for AT&T as its director of news and public relations before retiring in the early 1980s. His father began his career with the Chicago Herald Examiner in the late 1930s after graduating from the University of Kansas and later was a journalism instructor at Northwestern University, then an editor and writer of The Official Detective Magazine. After working as a reporter for the Chicago Daily News, he joined Illinois Bell as the phone company's news and public relations specialist, moving to Washington in 1962 to work for AT&T. He was a member of the National Press Club and the Society of Professional Journalists. Jerrold was the middle child of two siblings, Tom of Portola Valley, Calif., and Donna Field of Naples, Fla.

Jerry Mundis was previously married and helped raise two sons in the Catskills then moved to Greenwich Village in New York City. 

Mundis died from complications of COVID-19 in Manhattan on April 4, 2020, at the age of 79.

References

External links 

 Jerrold Mundis on CNBC and other media outlets on money and debt Jerrold Mundis - 'On the Media, In Seminar'
 Jerrold Mundis writing from American Heritage, December 1967, Volume 19, Issue 1, "He Took The Bull By The Horns," He Took The Bull By The Horns | AMERICAN HERITAGE
 Jerrold Mundis on Debtor's Anonymous in the New York Times A WAY BACK FROM DEEP DEBT
 Jerrold Mundis featured in trailer for the "Boris: The Chimp That Shook Manhattan" segment of "Raised Human" My Chimp and Me

1941 births
2020 deaths
American writers
COVID-19 pandemic in New York City
Deaths from the COVID-19 pandemic in New York (state)